Purushottam Shivaram Rege (Devanagari: पुरुषोत्तम शिवराम रेगे) (02 - August - 1910 to 17 - February - 1978 ) was a Marathi writer from Maharashtra, India.

He, commonly known by his initials Pu Shi Rege, was born in Ratnagiri District, Bombay Presidency, British India in 1910. After receiving his degrees in economics from Mumbai and London universities, he taught that subject at various colleges in Maharashtra and Goa. He retired in the 1970s as the principal of Elphinstone College in Mumbai.

Rege held a devout Shakta (शाक्त) belief centered on goddess Shantadurga (शांतादुर्गा).

He presided over Marathi Sahitya Sammelan at Wardha in 1969.

Literary work
The following is a partial list of Rege's works:

Critique

 Marmabhed (मर्मभेद)
 Chhandsi  (छांदसी)

Autobiography

 Eka Pidhiche Atmakathan (एका पिढीचे आत्मकथन)

Novels

 Matruka (मातृका)
 Awalokita (अवलोकिता)
 Sawitri (सावित्री)
 Rennu (रेणू)

Play

 Ranga Panchalik (रंग पांचालिक)

Collections of poems

 Sadhana Ani Itar Kavita (साधना आणि इतर कविता) (1931)
 Himasek (हिमसेक) (1943)
 Priyal (प्रियाळ) (1972)
 Dola (दोला) (1962)
 Dusara Pakshi (हसरा पक्षी) (1966)
 Suhrud Gatha (सुह्रदगाथा ) (1975)
 Aniha (अनीह) (published posthumously in 1984) 
 Fulora (फुलोरा’)
 Gandharekha (गंधरेखा) 
 Pushkala (पुष्कळा)
 Pu. Shi. Rege Yanchi Niwadak Kawita (पु. शि. रेगे यांची निवडक  कविता ) (Edited by Prakash Deshpande)
 Pu. Shi. Rege : Vyakti aanni Waangmaya, 2007 (पु० शि० रेगे : व्यक्ती आणि वाङ्मय), by Professor (Dr.) S. M. Tadkodkar, Goa University, Goa - 403 206

Indian male short story writers
Marathi-language writers
Marathi-language poets
1910 births
1978 deaths
Place of birth unknown
Alumni of the University of London
20th-century Indian poets
20th-century Indian short story writers
Indian male poets
Indian male novelists
Writers from Mumbai
20th-century Indian novelists
Novelists from Maharashtra
Poets from Maharashtra
20th-century Indian male writers
Presidents of the Akhil Bharatiya Marathi Sahitya Sammelan